Haploniscidae is a family of isopods belonging to the order Isopoda.

Genera:
 Abyssoniscus Birstein, 1971
 Antennuloniscus Menzies, 1962
 Aspidoniscus Menzies & Schultz, 1968
 Chandraniscus George, 2004
 Chauliodoniscus Lincoln, 1985
 Haploniscus Richardson, 1908
 Hydroniscus Hansen, 1916
 Mastigoniscus Lincoln, 1985

References

Isopoda